Titles with the Word Fountain (abbreviated as TWTWF) is the ninth studio album by Liars, released on September 21, 2018, by Mute. The album is a follow-up to TFCF and was described as a sequel by sole permanent member Angus Andrew, with the music recorded during the same sessions that resulted in that album.

Track listing

References

2018 albums
Liars (band) albums
Mute Records albums